WSCC may refer to:

 WSCC-FM, a radio station (94.3 FM) licensed to Goose Creek, South Carolina, United States
 WLTQ (AM), a radio station (730 AM) licensed to Charleston, South Carolina, United States and formerly called WSCC
 Washington State Community College, a two-year college in Marietta, Ohio, United States
 Washington State Convention Center, in Seattle, Washington, United States
 Walters State Community College, a community college in Morristown, Tennessee, United States
 West Somerset Community College, a comprehensive school located in Minehead, Somerset, England
 West Sussex County Council, the authority governing West Sussex, England
 West Shore Community College, a community college with its main campus in Mason County, Michigan, United States 
 Wallace State Community College, a community college located in Hanceville, Alabama, United States
 White Shepherd Club of Canada, a club for fanciers of the White Shepherd Dog   
 Western Systems Coordinating Council, a North American regional electric reliability council merged in 2002 with the Western Electricity Coordinating Council